Palden may refer to:

Khenchen Palden Sherab (born 1942), scholar and lama in the Nyingma school of Tibetan Buddhism
Lobsang Palden Yeshe (1738–1780), the Sixth Panchen Lama of Tashilhunpo Monastery in Tibet
Palden Gyatso (born 1933), Tibetan Buddhist monk
Palden Lhamo, protecting Dharmapala of the teachings of Gautama Buddha in the Gelug school of Tibetan Buddhism
Palden Tenpai Nyima (1782–1853), the Seventh Panchen Lama of Tibet
Palden Thondup Namgyal (1923–1982), the 12th and last Chogyal (king) of Sikkim
Sherab Palden Beru (born 1915), exiled Tibetan thangka artist